Dame Janet Elaine Paul  (née Wilkinson; 9 November 1919 – 28 July 2004) was a New Zealand publisher, painter and art historian, based in Wellington.

She was married to Blackwood Paul and they had a publishing business together specialising in New Zealand poetry. After her husband's death, she was courted by Denis Glover, one of the poets they published. From 1971 to 1980, she was art librarian at the Alexander Turnbull Library in Wellington.

Janet and Blackwood Paul had four daughters, one of whom, Joanna Margaret Paul, became a well-known New Zealand artist, poet, publisher and film-maker.

In the 1997 Queen's Birthday Honours, Paul was appointed a Dame Companion of the New Zealand Order of Merit, for services to publishing, writing and painting.

References

External links 
 Obituary: Dame Janet Paul

1919 births
2004 deaths
New Zealand artists
New Zealand publishers (people)
People from Wellington City
Dames Companion of the New Zealand Order of Merit
Entrican family